Jytte Abildstrøm (born 25 March 1934) is a Danish film actress. She has appeared in 40 films since 1956. She was born in Copenhagen, Denmark. She and her husband Søren Mygind are the parents of Peter Mygind.

Filmography

 Julestjerner (2012)
 Der var engang en dreng (2006)
 Freak Show 2003 (2003)
 Flyvende farmor (2001)
 Prop og Berta (2000)
 Dykkerne (2000)
 Hannibal & Jerry (1997)
 Jungledyret (1993)
 Felix (1982)
 Usynlige pattebarn, Det (1982)
 The Adventures of Picasso (1978)
 Prins Piwi (1974)
 Mafiaen - det er osse mig! (1974)
 Fra Poetens pen - et udpluk af nye og gamle tekster skrevet af Poul Sørensen (1974)
 Askepot (1973)
 Høgejumfruen (1973)
 Hashtræet (1973)
 Mannen som slutade röka (1972)
 Mor, jeg har patienter (1972)
 Den forsvundne fuldmægtig (1971)
 Revolutionen i vandkanten (1971)
 Bennys badekar (1971)
 Svend, Knud og Valdemar (1970)
 Snedronningen (1970)
 Ikke et ord om Harald (1970)
 Kameldamen (1969)
 Far laver sovsen (1967)
 Thomas er fredløs (1967)
 Mig og min lillebror (1967)
 Kærligheden varer længst (1967)
 Soyas tagsten (1966)
 Min søsters børn (1966)
 Hold da helt ferie (1965)
 Sytten (1965)
 Don Olsen kommer til byen (1964)
 Fem mand og Rosa (1964)
 Sommer i Tyrol (1964)
 Soldaterkammerater på efterårsmanøvre (1961)
 Forelsket i København (1960)
 Helle for Helene (1959)
 Poeten og Lillemor (1959)
 Vi som går stjernevejen (1956)

References

External links

1934 births
Living people
Danish film actresses
Actresses from Copenhagen
20th-century Danish actresses